Vatne is a village in Sandnes municipality in Rogaland county, Norway. The Vatneleiren military base is located in Vatne.

It is considered a part of the Stavanger/Sandnes metropolitan area.

References

Villages in Rogaland
Boroughs and neighbourhoods of Sandnes